Greater Palestine is an irredentist notion used by some Palestinian nationalists seeking to establish a Palestinian nation state over the whole of former Mandatory Palestine.

History 

The idea of Greater Palestine has existed since the times of the Roman Empire, in the form of the province of Syria Palestina.
It included the Golan Heights, northern Jordan, Palestine, Israel, and southern Lebanon. The idea persisted through the Byzantine Empire, as the province of Palaestina Prima, later succeeded by the provinces of Palaestina Secunda and Palaestina Salutaris. The area of these provinces extended over huge distances, from the Sinai Peninsula to the Golan Heights.

In 1920, during the later stages of the dissolution of the Ottoman Empire, the United Kingdom established Mandatory Palestine in the south of the Levant. The Emirate of Transjordan was set up as a British protectorate within the Mandate, but outside the stipulations of the Balfour Declaration.

Jordan
In a press conference, Ahmad al-Shukeiri declared that Jordan is "the homeland of the Palestine Liberation Organization and Jordan's people are its people." He also reminded that "the return of the East Bank to the motherland, in mind and conscience, and in spirit and body, is a basic step on the road of the return of the stolen homeland."

During the Jordanian Civil War between Palestinian guerrilla groups and the Jordanian Army, the Palestinians managed to take control of cities such as Ar-Ramtha, Irbid, and Jerash. This was seen as an attempt to take over all of Jordan as a first step to liberate the rest of "historical Palestine" as seen by the PLO. However, the PLO would be defeated in mid-1971 and exiled to Lebanon.

In the early 1970s, the Palestinians began to be stereotyped in Jordan. Jordanians started to refer to Palestinian-Jordanians as Baljikiyyah (Belgians). This epithet continues to be used as a national insult against Palestinian Jordanians today.

A 1975 article by the PLO:

Yasser Arafat in letter to Jordanian Students' Congress in Baghdad on 12 November 1974:

Until the late 1980s, the PLO continued to make irredentist claims by expressing their desire for Jordan to be part of the next Palestinian state.

From the River to the Sea
From the River to the Sea is, and forms part of, a popular political slogan used by some Palestinian nationalists. It contains the notion that the land which lies between the River Jordan and the Mediterranean Sea be entirely placed under Arab rule at the cost of the State of Israel, excluding the contested Golan Heights, conquered from Syria in 1967 and unilaterally annexed in 1981. It has been used frequently by Arab leaders and is often chanted at anti-Israel demonstrations.

The slogan is versatile with numerous variations, including "From the river to the sea, Palestine will be free," "Palestine is ours from the river to the sea," and "Palestine is Islamic from the river to the sea". Islamic scholars also claim the Mahdi will also declare the slogan in the following format: "Jerusalem is Arab Muslim, and Palestine — all of it, from the river to the sea — is Arab Muslim."

See also 
 Palestinian nationalism
 Paulet–Newcombe Agreement
 Treaty of London (1946)
 King Hussein's federation plan
 Jordanian disengagement from the West Bank

Bibliography

References 

Irredentism
Palestinian nationalism